Eustace Malden (19 August 1863 – 3 December 1947) was an English cricketer. He played thirteen first-class matches for Kent between 1892 and 1893.

References

External links
 

1863 births
1947 deaths
Sportspeople from Brighton
English cricketers
Kent cricketers
East of England cricketers